Lachey's: Raising the Bar also known as Lachey's Bar is a docuseries on A&E starring brothers Nick Lachey and Drew Lachey. The show depicts the development of their sports bar and restaurant Lachey's Bar, located in their hometown of Cincinnati, Ohio as well as sharing a look into their home lives with their families. A&E picked up the series for a ten episode order in May 2015, and episodes aired from July 15 to September 9, 2015.

Lachey's Bar closed its doors permanently in February 2018.

Cast

Main
Nick Lachey
Drew Lachey

Featured
Vanessa Lachey (Nick's wife)
 Lea Lachey (Drew's wife)

Episodes

Broadcast
Internationally, the series premiered in Australia on November 4, 2015 on A&E Australia.

References

External links
 

A&E (TV network) original programming
2010s American reality television series
2015 American television series debuts
2015 American television series endings
English-language television shows
Television shows set in Cincinnati